Port-aux-Français is the main settlement of the Kerguelen Islands, and French Southern and Antarctic Lands, in the south Indian Ocean.

Occupancy
The settlement is located on the shore of the Gulf of Morbihan. About 45 residents spend the winter there; the group can reach over 120 people in summer. The place was chosen in 1949 by the head of mission Pierre Sicaud because of its sheltered location which was suitable for the construction of an air runway, though this was never built.

From 1955 to 1957, a French slaughterhouse company, SIDAP, built an elephant seal processing plant equipped with Australian machinery. The factory opened its doors just after the wedding of the director, Marc Péchenart, and Martine Raulin on 16 December 1957. This was the first marriage ever celebrated on the islands. The factory closed in 1960, and the equipment was sent to Réunion in 2005.

Port-aux-Français has a shallow seaport which allows the unloading of supply ships (usually the Marion Dufresne) with barges shuttling to the quay.

The settlement, in addition to the logistical facilities for its own operation, hosts scientific laboratories (biology, geophysics), technical stations (such as meteorology, telecommunications and satellite tracking), a cinema and a small medical centre. There is also a small Catholic ChurchNotre-Dame des Ventsin the settlement.

Tidal gauges
The base of Port-aux-Français is equipped with a marigraphic station, having three measuring devices:
 two tide gauges to measure pressure at sea bottom
 a radar measuring the sea level.
The two marigraphs and the radar send data to a local server, which relays them hourly to the Internet via the Argos satellite system.

Climate
Port-aux-Français has an ocean-moderated mild tundra climate (Köppen climate classification ET).

Snowfall is possible in all months, though more common in winter.

See also
 List of Antarctic research stations
 List of Antarctic field camps

References

Geography of the Kerguelen Islands
Populated places established in 1944
Outposts of Antarctica